The women's 200 metre breaststroke event at the 2004 Olympic Games was contested at the Olympic Aquatic Centre of the Athens Olympic Sports Complex in Athens, Greece on August 18 and 19.

U.S. swimmer and world-record holder Amanda Beard completed a full set of medals in the event, adding a gold to her silver from Atlanta (1996) and bronze from Sydney (2000). She posted an Olympic record of 2:23.37, holding off Australia's Leisel Jones by 0.23 of a second for a silver medal in 2:23.60. Anne Poleska, who had been seventh at the halfway mark, moved quickly into the field and finished strongly with a bronze in a personal best of 2:25.82, earning Germany's first individual medal of the meet since its reunification in 1990.

Hungary's Ágnes Kovács, the gold medalist from Sydney, finished outside the medals in fifth place behind Japan's Masami Tanaka with a time of 2:26.12.

Records
Prior to this competition, the existing world and Olympic records were:

The following new world and Olympic records were set during this competition.

Results

Heats

Semifinals

Semifinal 1

Semifinal 2

Final

References

External links
Official Olympic Report

W
2004 in women's swimming
Women's events at the 2004 Summer Olympics